The 2016–17 Championnat de France Amateur was the 19th season of the fourth tier in the French football league system in its current format. The competition was contested by 64 clubs split geographically across 4 groups of 16 teams each. The teams included amateur clubs (although a few are semi-professional) and the reserve teams of professional clubs.

Teams
On July 15, the FFF ratified the constitution of the competition, and published the groups as follows:

 47 clubs who were neither relegated or promoted from the 2015–16 Championnat de France amateur groups.
 1 team administratively relegated from 2015–16 Ligue 2 (Évian TG)
 1 team relegated from 2015–16 Championnat National (Fréjus Saint-Raphaël). 
 12 teams promoted from 2015–16 Championnat de France Amateur 2. (Rennes reserves, Chartres, ES Paulhan-Pézenas, Andrézieux, Reims reserves, Lille reserves, Le Havre, Annecy, Saint-Maur, Montpellier reserves, Raon-l'Étape and Granville).
 2 teams reprieved from relegation from 2015–16 Championnat de France Amateur (Rodez and Vitré)
 Sporting Club Toulon, formed from a merger of Toulon-Le Las and Toulon, and taking the former's place in the league.

On 9 August, the FFF confirmed the decision by Évian TG not to participate in the CFA following the club's recent receivership. Because the decision comes after 15 July, there will be no replacement and Group C will instead operate with 15 clubs.

League tables

Season outcomes
Outcomes below are provisional and subject to ratification by the FFF.

Champions and promotions
Cholet, Entente SSG, Grenoble and Rodez are promoted to National. Although Rennes (res) finished at the top of Group A, reserve sides are not eligibile for promotion.

Grenoble are Champions of 2016–17 Championnat de France Amateur, due to having the best record of the four group winning sides against the teams finishing in 2nd to 6th in their respective groups.

Relegation
Plabennec, Nantes (res), Châteaubriant, Wasquehal, Dieppe, Calais RUFC, Auxerre (res), Mulhouse, Paulhan-Pézenas, Le Pontet and Montpellier (res) are provisionally relegated to National 3, subject to reprieves.

Calais RUFC were subsequently given an administrative relegation by the FFF, and as a consequence will play in the top level of regional football in 2017–18.

Reprieves
On 30 May the FFF announced that Furiani-Agliani were to be denied promotion from 2016–17 Championnat de France Amateur 2. This decision was overturned on appeal.

On 7 June the FFF announced that AS Saint-Ouen-l'Aumône were to be denied promotion from 2016–17 Championnat de France Amateur 2, and as a result Paulhan-Pézenas would be reprieved. This decision was ratified on appeal.

If any other administrative events lead to teams from outside the relegation places being relegated, already relegated teams will be reprieved in the following order:

Best 14th placed teams
Based on record against the teams finishing in 9th to 13th place in their respective groups.

Best 15th placed teams
Based on record against the teams finishing in 10th to 14th place in their respective groups.

Top scorers

References 

 

2016-17
4
Fra